Daniel Breton (born June 18, 1962) is an environmental activist and politician in the Canadian province of Quebec. He was the member of the National Assembly of Quebec for the riding of Sainte-Marie—Saint-Jacques between 2012 and 2014.

Early life and activism
Breton was born in Montreal and studied political science at the University of Montreal and the University of Quebec at Montreal. He was a principal organizer of a November 2001 march in Montreal against Canada's military intervention in Afghanistan. During the march, he was quoted as saying, "We held this demonstration because we are against a military solution to settle the conflict and the fight against terrorism. We are against terrorism, but war is not the solution."

Breton subsequently founded Québec-Vert-Kyoto (later known as QuébecKyoto), which advocated in favour of the Kyoto Accord on climate change. In 2004, he led an ultimately successful protest against Hydro-Quebec's plans to launch the Suroit natural gas power project near Beauharnois. The following year, he called for the Montreal Transit Corporation to invest in suburban commuter trains rather than building a new bridge between Laval and Montreal.

In June 2007, Breton called on Canadian environment minister John Baird to resign over the Stephen Harper government's handling of the Kyoto Accord. Breton described Baird as "neither competent nor willing to carry in a serious, non-partisan manner, the heavy burden of the environment portfolio."

Breton spoke against Quebec's plans for shale gas exploration in 2010.

On November 29, 2012, Daniel Breton resigned from his post as environment minister less than two months after taking office. He was an unsuccessful candidate during the 2018 election.

Political activism
Breton helped re-launch the dormant Green Party of Quebec for the 2003 Quebec general election and was the party's candidate in Hochelaga-Maisonneuve. He finished sixth against Parti Québécois incumbent Louise Harel. Breton also worked for the Green Party of Canada. He supported the sovereigntist option in the 1995 Quebec referendum on sovereignty and signed a joint statement in favour of Quebec independence in 2007.

In 2008, Breton left the Green Party to join the Canadian New Democratic Party (NDP). In joining the NDP, he was quoted as saying, "what is at stake in 2008 is not the sovereignty of Quebec but the sovereignty of Canada. We are in the process of losing control over our natural resources, over our economy, of our big businesses and our political sovereignty." He ran as a star candidate for the party in the 2008 federal election and finished third in Jeanne-Le Ber. He was not a candidate in the 2011 federal election, in which the NDP made a historic breakthrough to become the dominant federal party in Quebec.

In 2012, Breton joined the Parti Québécois and ran successfully for the party in the 2012 election, retaining the riding of Sainte-Marie–Saint-Jacques for the PQ. He was the minister of Sustainable Development, Environment, Wildlife and Parks from September 19 to November 29, 2012 in the government of Pauline Marois.  He was defeated in the 2014 election by Manon Massé of Québec Solidaire.

Electoral record

* Result compared to Action démocratique

References

1962 births
Canadian environmentalists
Living people
New Democratic Party candidates for the Canadian House of Commons
Quebec candidates for Member of Parliament
Parti Québécois MNAs
Politicians from Montreal
21st-century Canadian politicians